Cilindro Municipal (The Municipal Cylinder) was an indoor arena in Montevideo, Uruguay which was opened in 1956, for Uruguay's Industrial Exhibition of the Production of international character. The arena was used as the main venue of the 1967 edition of the FIBA World Cup, for which it had a seating capacity of 18,000 spectators.

History
Over the years, many artists performed at the arena, including Bob Dylan, The Mission, UB40, Van Halen, and Molotov. On October 8, 2001, Eric Clapton performed at the arena, during his Reptile World Tour, and drew a crowd of 18,000 fans.

Fire damage and demolishing
On 21 October 2010, the Cilindro Municipal's roof fell down atop the inside structure because of a fire, the source of which is unknown. The fire caused severe damage to the arena's seats. The Uruguayan Interior Minister, Eduardo Bonomi, announced that it would be demolished.

A work group started doing construction studies in the middle of December 2010, and in March 2011, the Intendencia of Montevideo announced that the damaged "Cilindro Municipal" would be replaced by a new "Olympic" stadium, with a cultural, as well as sportive scope of use. Work on the new arena was originally expected to start in 2012, and to last for three years. The arena was finally demolished successfully on 12 May 2014, and was eventually replaced by the new Antel Arena which opened in November 2018.

References

External links

Official site 
Disney on ice 
Article about what a reconstruction of the Cilindro would entail 

Basketball venues in Uruguay
Buildings and structures in Montevideo
Indoor arenas in Uruguay
Multi-purpose stadiums in Uruguay
Sport in Montevideo
Sports venues completed in 1956